Serbia competed at the 2014 Winter Olympics in Sochi, Russia, from 7 to 23 February 2014. A team of eight athletes in five sports was selected, representing a decrease of two athletes from Vancouver. Serbia has also qualified in snowboarding for the first time ever.

Alpine skiing 

Serbia qualified 1 man and 1 woman by the latest FIS Olympic list.

Biathlon 

Based on their performance at the 2012 and 2013 Biathlon World Championships, Serbia qualified 1 man.

Bobsleigh 

Serbia has qualified 2 men by the latest FIBT rankings.

* – Denotes the driver of each sled

Cross-country skiing 

Serbia has qualified 2 men and 1 woman.

Distance

Sprint

Snowboarding 

Serbia qualified 1 woman by the latest FIS Olympic list.

Alpine

See also
Serbia at the 2014 Summer Youth Olympics

References

External links 
Serbia at the 2014 Winter Olympics

Nations at the 2014 Winter Olympics
2014
Winter Olympics